Mitsubishi Electric United States (officially Mitsubishi Electric US Holdings, Inc.) is the principal subsidiary of Mitsubishi Electric Corporation in the United States. It is headquartered in Cypress, California and was incorporated in 2002 and its affiliates, have roughly 31 locations throughout North America with approximately 5,000 employees. Its main affiliate companies are: Mitsubishi Electric Power Products, Inc.; Mitsubishi Electric US, Inc.; Mitsubishi Electric Automotive America, Inc.; Mitsubishi Electric Automation, Inc.; and Mitsubishi Electric Research Laboratories, Inc.

Within Mitsubishi Electric US, Inc. are five separate divisions: Semiconductors and Devices Division, Elevator and Escalator Division, Mitsubishi Electric Heating & Air Conditioning, International Purchasing Division, and Visual and Imaging Systems Division. 

Mitsubishi Electric US Holdings, Inc. and its group companies engage in engineering, manufacturing, sales and after-service in several business areas. Its principal products include semiconductor devices, automotive electrical components, elevators and escalators, cooling and heating products, industrial-use factory automation products, display walls, digital printers, digital signage, satellite systems, large-scale video displays and power generators, transmission and distribution equipment and railway systems.

History

Mitsubishi Electric announced a major restructuring of its activities in the United States in October 1998, including the closure of its Astronet Corporation subsidiary and cellular mobile telephone unit, and a focusing on its digital television, computer hardware and building systems activities.

In June 2000 Mitsubishi Electric and NEC Corporation announced that they would combine their U.S. monitor manufacturing and marketing operations into a new 50:50 joint-venture company, NEC-Mitsubishi Electronics Display of America.

In May 2003 Mitsubishi Electric Power Products Inc. opened a new  headquarters and manufacturing facility in Warrendale, Pennsylvania.

In April 2013, Mitsubishi Electric Power Products, Inc. opened a 350,000 square-foot power transformer factory in Memphis, Tennessee, built at a cost of $200 million. and shipped its first transformer in December 2014.

In April 2014, Mitsubishi Electric formed the Visual and Imaging Systems Division to market and support display walls and imaging products. Mitsubishi Electric US ceased the sale of photovoltaic modules in the U.S. in 2017.

In January 2018, the company acquired the power device distribution business of Powerex, Inc., a joint venture of Japan-based Mitsubishi Electric Corporation and General Electric Company, and rolled it into its Semiconductor Division, which was renamed the Semiconductors and Devices Division.

Also in January 2018, Mitsubishi Electric announced an agreement to enter into a 50-50 joint venture with Ingersoll-Rand to market, distribute, and support zoned comfort solutions and variable refrigerant flow systems in the U.S. and select countries in Latin America.

Products
Mitsubishi Electric United States' principal products include:
 Air Conditioning and Heating 
 Automotive Electronics and Electrical Components
 Building Automation Systems
 Commercial Hand Dryers
 Display Walls
 Elevators and Escalators
 Factory Automation Equipment
 Imaging Products
 Photographic and Thermal Printers
 Power Transmission and Distribution Equipment
 Rail Transit Systems
 Robotics
 Semiconductors and Devices
 Stadium and Arena Displays
 Uninterruptible Power Supplies
 Space & Sensing Systems

References

External links
Mitsubishi Electric US

Mitsubishi Electric subsidiaries
2002 establishments in California
American subsidiaries of foreign companies
American companies established in 2002
Manufacturing companies established in 2002
Electronics companies established in 2002
Companies based in Orange County, California
Cypress, California